"Impeach the President" is a single by funk band the Honey Drippers, written and produced by Roy Charles Hammond, known as Roy C.  It was first released on Alaga Records in 1973, and was re-released to iTunes by Tuff City Records in 2017, after being sampled hundreds of times since the mid-1980s. It is a protest song advocating the impeachment of then-President of the United States Richard Nixon. In the chorus, the band chants the song's title while Roy persuades them to stop. The B-side is "Roy C's Theme".

Significance
The song is famous for having its drum pattern being one of the most adapted beats in hip hop, R&B, jazz and even pop music. The hi-hat is opened on the sixth note of the drum pattern, similar to "Hihache" by the Lafayette Afro Rock Band which does so on the 8th (which is hidden in several R&B songs) and this means that some songs which sample "Impeach" also interpolate "Hihache", e.g. Ronny Jordan's "Come with Me".  Below is a rough list of songs which sample or interpolate the song and its drum intro:

Samples by others
1980s
MC Shan – "The Bridge" (1986)
Eric B & Rakim – "Eric B. Is President" (1986)
BDP – "The Bridge Is Over" (1987)
MC Shan – "Project Ho" (1987)
Audio Two – "Top Billin'" (1988)
N.W.A – "Gangsta Gangsta" (1988)
DJ Jazzy Jeff & The Fresh Prince – “As We Go” (1988)
Big Daddy Kane – "Smooth Operator" (1989)
Cool C – "Juice Crew Dis" (1989)
Nice & Smooth – "Funky for You" (1989)

1990s
Public Enemy - Anti-Nigger Machine (1990)
LL Cool J – "Around the Way Girl" (1990)
LL Cool J – "6 Minutes of Pleasure" (1990)
De La Soul – "Ring Ring Ring (Ha Ha Hey)" (1991)
Small Change – "Why" (1991)
EPMD – "Give the People" (1991)
Naughty By Nature – "Ghetto Bastard" (1991)
Ronny Jordan – "See the New" (1992)
Ronny Jordan – "Summer Smile" (1992)
Father MC – "Close to You" (1992)
Digable Planets – "Rebirth of Slick" (1992)
Joey Diggs – "Your Love Keeps Working on Me" (1992)
The Emotions – "I Want to Thank You for Your Love" (1992)
Bobby Brown – "That's the Way Love Is" (1992)
Ice Cube – "Gangsta's Fairytale" (1992)
Janet Jackson – "That's the Way Love Goes" (1993)
Kris Kross – "Jump" (1993)
2Pac – "I Get Around" (1993)
Biggie – "Unbelievable" (1994)
Sounds of Blackness – "I'm Going All the Way" (1994)
Tevin Campbell – "I'm Ready" (1994)
Prince – "The Most Beautiful Girl in the World" (1994)*
Shabba Ranks – "Mr. Loverman" (1994)
Ronny Jordan – "Shit Goes Down" (1994)
Aaliyah – "No One Knows How To Love Me Quite Like You Do" (1994)
Thug Life – "Pour Out a Little Liquor" (1994)
Diana King – "Shy Guy" (1995)
TLC – "Waterfalls" (1995)
InI – "Fakin Jax'" (1995)
Take That – "Never Forget" (1995)
Kut Klose – "Like You've Never Been Done" (1995)
Pete Rock – "A Little Soul"
Barry White & Chris Rock – "Basketball Jones" (1996)
Nas – "The Message" (1996)
Alanis Morissette – "You Learn" (1996)
George Benson – "The Thinker" (1996)
Wu-Tang Clan – "As High As Wu Tang Get" (1997)
Capone-N-Noreaga – "Bloody Money" (1997)
Prince – "Love Sign" (Shocklee Remix) (1998)
George Benson – "Cruise Control" (1998)
Shaggy – "Luv Me, Luv Me" (1998)

*Note that the studio version is an interpolation and the live version on 3 Nites in Miami directly samples "Impeach the President".

2000s
Fourplay – "Save Some Love for Me" (2000)
Lazlo Bane – "Superman" (2000)
Ulrich Schnauss – "Nobody's Home" (2001)
Hefner – "Dive into You" (2001)
Nas – "I Can" (2003)
Amy Winehouse – "You Sent Me Flying" (2003)
50 Cent – "In My Hood" (2005)
Kim Waters – "Midnight at the Oasis" (2006)
Immortal Technique – "Impeach the President" (2006)
The Cool Kids – "Catch of the Day" (2009)
Stevie Wonder – "There's Nothing Greater Than the Love You Showed Me" (2009)

2010s
Jazmine Sullivan - "Holding You Down" (Goin' in Circles) (2010)
NK-OK – "Summer Madness" (2011)
Little Mix – "How Ya Doin'" (2013)
Joey Badass – "Don't Quit Your Dayjob" (2013)
Carl Lurid – "I.D." (2014)
J. Cole – "Wet Dreamz" (2015)
Flo Rida – "My House" (2015)
Deeb – "Outskirts" (2016)
Brock Berrigan – "So in Love" (2016)
MR DM – "In My Time" (2017)

See also
"Let's Impeach the President", 2006 protest song advocating the impeachment of President George W. Bush by Neil Young
"Synthetic Substitution", 1973 protest song by Melvin Bliss

References

Funk songs
1973 singles
1973 songs
Sampled drum breaks
Protest songs
Songs about Richard Nixon
Presidential impeachment in the United States